Jens-Ole "Ole" Malmgren (born 16 February 1946) is a Danish composer. Piano lessons from Leif Bülow Nielsen 1967-68. He spent some instructive years with Gruppen for Alternativ Musik prior to doing committee work with Det Unge Tonekunstnerselskab (DUT) and Danish Composers Society for a number of years. 
Works for small and greater ensembles, e.g. "Circulations" to Elisabeth Klein first performed 1976. Read more.

List of works (selected) 
 1974 "Savoyages" for symphony orchestra in 2 movements
 1976 "Circulations" for piano, dedication Elisabeth Klein
 1980/2018 ”Omkring Hamlet”, opera in 6 scenes - libretto by the composer after Johs. Sløk's danish translation of "Hamlet, Prince of Denmark" by W. Shakespeare
 2006 "Symphonic Jazz 1 - Traditional" – "Symphonic Jazz 2 - Avantgarde" is planned 
 2010 ”Helike Athanatos”, opera in 6 scenes, libretto by Franz Knappik, idea by Andreas Drekis
 2013 ”Der BabelƨTurm” for soprano and chamber ensemble, lyrics by Saadi and Goethe
 2014 ”We are all travellers” version for choir a capella, lyrics by Maria Fuchs
 2015 "Lights" for symphony orchestra with piano

References

External links 
 Secretariat For Contemporary Music (Danish)
 Danish Composers Society (partly Danish)
 Official Homepage

Danish composers
Male composers